Prochoreutis stellaris is a moth of the family Choreutidae. It is found from France and Italy through Austria, Hungary and Slovakia to Ukraine and then south to Romania, Bulgaria and Greece, North Macedonia and Albania.

References

External links
lepiforum.de

Prochoreutis
Moths of Europe
Moths of Asia